The Invisible Host is a 1930 American mystery/thriller novel written by the husband-wife team of Gwen Bristow and Bruce Manning.  It was published by The Mystery League, Inc.  Though little remembered today, it did well enough in its own time for Hollywood to adapt it into a feature film, 1934's The Ninth Guest (which name would also be utilized for subsequent editions of the book). Before its cinematic adaptation, Pulitzer Prize winning dramatist Owen Davis had adapted it for a 1930 Broadway play with the same name as the subsequent film (The Ninth Guest). It could be considered an example of the "old dark house" type of thriller.

It has been noted that Agatha Christie's much more famous tale, 1939's Ten Little Indians, bears striking similarities to this novel.  Predating Christie's text by almost a decade, The Invisible Host tells the story of eight people who are invited to a deserted, well-appointed New Orleans penthouse by an anonymous invitation. There is no evidence Agatha Christie saw either the play (which had a brief run on Broadway from August to October 1930) or the 1934 film.

Once at the penthouse the guests, who are all known to each other, are served a superb dinner. Shortly thereafter, they are made aware by a voice over the radio that they are all going to die before the night is out. The unseen host has meticulously prepared the demise of each guest, and has booby-trapped the penthouse to prevent anyone from escaping. As they steadily succumb to the murderer's devices, some begin to suspect that the killer may be one of them.

Characters
 Henry Abbott – professor
 Margaret Chisholm – socialite
 Peter Daly – playwright
 Sylvia Inglesby – lawyer
 Jason Osgood – businessman
 Dr. Murray Chambers Reid – university professor
 Tim Slamon (not Salmon) – politician
 Jean Trent – actress
 Hawkins, the Butler

References

Notes

American horror novels
American mystery novels
American thriller novels
1930 American novels
Novels set in New Orleans
American novels adapted into films